The 2015–16 Army Black Knights men's basketball team represented the United States Military Academy during the 2015–16 NCAA Division I men's basketball season. The Black Knights, led by seventh year head coach Zach Spiker, played their home games at Christl Arena and were members of the Patriot League. They finished the season 19–14, 9–9 in Patriot League play to finish in a four way tie for fourth place. They defeated Colgate in the quarterfinals of the Patriot League tournament to advance to the semifinals where they lost to Holy Cross. They were invited to the CollegeInsider.com Tournament, where they lost in the first round at NJIT.

The season was notable for swingman Kyle Wilson passing the 2,000 point mark for his career, making him the fourth player in Academy history and the sixth in Patriot League history to do so.

On March 25, 2016, Zach Spiker resigned as head coach to accept the head coaching position at Drexel. He finished with a seven-year record of 102–112. On April 6, the school hired Jimmy Allen as head coach.

Previous season
The Black Knights finished the 2015–16 season 15–15, 6–12 in Patriot League play to finish in last place. They lost in the first round of the Patriot League tournament to Navy.

Departures

Incoming recruits

2016 Class recruits

Roster

Schedule

|-
!colspan=9 style="background:#000000; color:#D6C499;"| Non-conference regular season

|-
!colspan=9 style="background:#000000; color:#D6C499;"| Patriot League regular season

|-
!colspan=9 style="background:#000000; color:#D6C499;"| Patriot League tournament

|-
!colspan=9 style="background:#000000; color:#D6C499;"| CIT

References

Army Black Knights men's basketball seasons
Army
Army Black Knights men's basketball
Army Black Knights men's basketball
Army